Ea Huar is a rural commune (xã) and village in the Buôn Đôn District of Đắk Lắk Province, Vietnam, not far from the Cambodia border. The commune covers an area of 45.91 square kilometres and at 1999 had a population of 2,255 people.

References

Communes of Đắk Lắk province
Populated places in Đắk Lắk province